A scenic trail is a trail (mostly, if not exclusively, in the United States) that may refer to:

 Appalachian National Scenic Trail
 Arizona National Scenic Trail
 Catskill Scenic Trail
 Continental Divide National Scenic Trail
 Florida National Scenic Trail
 Ice Age National Scenic Trail
 Little Miami Scenic Trail
 Natchez Trace National Scenic Trail
 National Scenic Trail
 New England National Scenic Trail
 North Country National Scenic Trail
 Pacific Crest National Scenic Trail
 Pacific Northwest National Scenic Trail
 Potomac Heritage National Scenic Trail

See also
 
 

Trails